In Greek mythology, Azaes (Ancient Greek: Ἀζάης) was one of the ten sons of Poseidon and Cleito in Plato's myth of Atlantis. He was the elder brother of Diaprepes and his other siblings were Atlas and Eumelus, Ampheres and Evaemon, Mneseus and Autochthon, and lastly, Elasippus and Mestor.

Mythology 
Azaeas, along with his nine siblings, became the heads of ten royal houses, each ruling a tenth portion of the island, according to a partition made by Poseidon himself, but all subject to the supreme dynasty of Atlas who was the eldest of the ten.

Notes

References 

 Plato, Critias in Plato in Twelve Volumes, Vol. 9 translated by W.R.M. Lamb. Cambridge, Massachusetts, Harvard University Press; London, William Heinemann Ltd. 1925. Online version at the Perseus Digital Library. Greek text available at the same website.

Children of Poseidon
Atlanteans
Atlantis